Jason Blades  (born 21 February 1970) is a British furniture restorer and television presenter. He grew up in Hackney, which in his childhood was a working class area of Inner London, and now lives in Ironbridge in Shropshire.

Early life
Blades was born in Brent, North London and raised in Hackney, East London with his mother and maternal half-brother. As an adult he learned that his father had 25 other children, from different mothers, in a number of different countries. He has dyslexia, which was not diagnosed at school. He experienced racism at school and from the police. As a young man he worked as a labourer and in factories. 

He enrolled in Buckinghamshire New University as a mature student to study Criminology. It was only then, aged 31, that he was diagnosed with the reading ability of an 11-year old.

Career
Blades and his wife Jade set up a charity based in High Wycombe, Out of the Dark, to train disadvantaged young people in furniture restoration. The charity lost funding, their marriage broke down, and he became homeless. He was supported by friends and by the Caribbean community. Around the same time, television producers saw a short film about the charity which led to his work as a presenter. He moved to Wolverhampton and established Jay & Co, a social enterprise to support disadvantaged and disengaged groups.

In 2021 Blades became trustee of a charity founded by singer Leigh-Anne Pinnock, The Black Fund. They had met years previously when Blades ran a youth club and choir which Pinnock, then 14 years old, joined.

Also in that year he released a memoir, Making It: How Love, Kindness and Community Helped Me Repair My Life, published by Pan Macmillan UK.

Blades was appointed Co-Chair of the Heritage Crafts Association in August 2022.

Television and radio
He is best known for presenting The Repair Shop, Money for Nothing, Jay Blades Home Fix and co-presenting Jay and Dom's Home Fix. 

He has also appeared on Would I Lie to You?, Celebrity Masterchef, Richard Osman's House of Games, and Michael McIntyre's The Wheel.

In August 2021, Blades  filmed a documentary programme for BBC One, Jay Blades: Learning to Read at 51, depicting his recent attempts, with the support of the charity Read Easy UK, to improve his literacy. He danced with Luba Mushtuk in the 2021 Strictly Come Dancing Christmas Special. In May 2022 he appeared in a three-part series on Channel 5 revisiting the area he grew up in, and interviewing childhood friends, experts, and witnesses to history. Jay Blades: No Place Like Home featured locations such as Ridley Road Market (the history of anti-fascist action in the 1940s), Newington Green Unitarian Church (slavery and abolitionism), the Pellici cafe (the Kray twins and gangsterism), and the site of the First World War bombing by airship.

In September 2022 Blades appeared on BBC Radio 4's Desert Island Discs and said that his childhood had been "blighted by racism and violence". In October 2022 Blades was the lead presenter for the edition of The Repair Shop which featured King Charles III.

Personal life
Blades lives in Ironbridge in Shropshire. He has three children. His youngest, a daughter, is from his first marriage and he has two sons from previous relationships. Blades married his second wife Lisa Zbozen in Barbados in November 2022.

Honours
Blades was appointed Member of the Order of the British Empire (MBE) in the 2021 Birthday Honours, for services to craft. He was  appointed the first Chancellor of Buckinghamshire New University in May 2022.

References

External links
 BBC News article, April 2020

Jay & Co.

Living people
People from Hackney Central
People from Ironbridge
British people of Barbadian descent
British people of Jamaican descent
Alumni of Buckinghamshire New University
People with dyslexia
1970 births
Members of the Order of the British Empire